In mathematics, particularly in the theories of Lie groups, algebraic groups and topological groups, a homogeneous space for a group G is a non-empty manifold or topological space X on which G acts transitively.  The elements of G are called the symmetries of X. A special case of this is when the group G in question is the automorphism group of the space X – here "automorphism group" can mean isometry group, diffeomorphism group, or homeomorphism group. In this case, X is homogeneous if intuitively X looks locally the same at each point, either in the sense of isometry (rigid geometry), diffeomorphism (differential geometry), or homeomorphism (topology). Some authors insist that the action of G be faithful (non-identity elements act non-trivially), although the present article does not. Thus there is a group action of G on X which can be thought of as preserving some "geometric structure" on X, and making X into a single G-orbit.

Formal definition
Let X be a non-empty set and G a group. Then X is called a G-space if it is equipped with an action of G on X. Note that automatically G acts by automorphisms (bijections) on the set. If X in addition belongs to some category, then the elements of G are assumed to act as automorphisms in the same category. That is, the maps on X coming from elements of G preserve the structure associated with the category (for example, if X is an object in Diff then the action is required to be by diffeomorphisms). A homogeneous space is a G-space on which G acts transitively.

Succinctly, if X is an object of the category C, then the structure of a G-space is a homomorphism:

into the group of automorphisms of the object X in the category C. The pair (X, ρ) defines a homogeneous space provided ρ(G) is a transitive group of symmetries of the underlying set of X.

Examples
For example, if X is a topological space, then group elements are assumed to act as homeomorphisms on X. The structure of a G-space is a group homomorphism ρ : G → Homeo(X) into the homeomorphism group of X.

Similarly, if X is a differentiable manifold, then the group elements are diffeomorphisms. The structure of a G-space is a group homomorphism ρ : G → Diffeo(X) into the diffeomorphism group of X.

Riemannian symmetric spaces are an important class of homogeneous spaces, and include many of the examples listed below.

Concrete examples include:

Isometry groups
Positive curvature:
 Sphere (orthogonal group): . If we consider one of these vectors as a base vector, then any other vector can be constructed using an orthogonal transformation. This shows us why we can construct  as a homogeneous space.
 Oriented sphere (special orthogonal group): 
 Projective space (projective orthogonal group): 
 Flat (zero curvature):
 Euclidean space (Euclidean group, point stabilizer is orthogonal group): An ≅ E(n)/O(n)
 Negative curvature:
 Hyperbolic space (orthochronous Lorentz group, point stabilizer orthogonal group, corresponding to hyperboloid model): Hn ≅ O+(1, n)/O(n)
 Oriented hyperbolic space: SO+(1, n)/SO(n)
 Anti-de Sitter space: AdSn+1 = O(2, n)/O(1, n)

Others
 Affine space over field K (for affine group, point stabilizer general linear group): An = Aff(n, K)/GL(n, K).
 Grassmannian: 
 Topological vector spaces (in the sense of topology)

Geometry
From the point of view of the Erlangen program, one may understand that "all points are the same", in the geometry of X. This was true of essentially all geometries proposed before Riemannian geometry, in the middle of the nineteenth century.

Thus, for example, Euclidean space, affine space and projective space are all in natural ways homogeneous spaces for their respective symmetry groups. The same is true of the models found of non-Euclidean geometry of constant curvature, such as hyperbolic space.

A further classical example is the space of lines in projective space of three dimensions (equivalently, the space of two-dimensional subspaces of a four-dimensional vector space). It is simple linear algebra to show that GL4 acts transitively on those. We can parameterize them by line co-ordinates: these are the 2×2 minors of the 4×2 matrix with columns two basis vectors for the subspace. The geometry of the resulting homogeneous space is the line geometry of Julius Plücker.

Homogeneous spaces as coset spaces
In general, if X is a homogeneous space of G, and Ho is the stabilizer of some marked point o in X (a choice of origin), the points of X correspond to the left cosets G/Ho, and the marked point o corresponds to the coset of the identity. Conversely, given a coset space G/H, it is a homogeneous space for G with a distinguished point, namely the coset of the identity. Thus a homogeneous space can be thought of as a coset space without a choice of origin.

For example, if H is the identity subgroup {e}, then X is the G-torsor, which explains why G-torsors are often described intuitively as " with forgotten identity".

In general, a different choice of origin o will lead to a quotient of G by a different subgroup Ho′ which is related to Ho by an inner automorphism of G.  Specifically,

where g is any element of G for which go = o′. Note that the inner automorphism (1) does not depend on which such g is selected; it depends only on g modulo Ho.

If the action of G on X is continuous and X is Hausdorff, then H is a closed subgroup of G. In particular, if G is a Lie group, then H is a Lie subgroup by Cartan's theorem.  Hence G/H is a smooth manifold and so X carries a unique smooth structure compatible with the group action.

One can go further to double coset spaces, notably Clifford–Klein forms Γ\G/H, where Γ is a discrete subgroup (of G) acting properly discontinuously.

Example
For example, in the line geometry case, we can identify H as a 12-dimensional subgroup of the 16-dimensional general linear group, GL(4), defined by conditions on the matrix entries

h13 = h14 = h23 = h24 = 0,

by looking for the stabilizer of the subspace spanned by the first two standard basis vectors. That shows that X has dimension 4.

Since the homogeneous coordinates given by the minors are 6 in number, this means that the latter are not independent of each other. In fact, a single quadratic relation holds between the six minors, as was known to nineteenth-century geometers.

This example was the first known example of a Grassmannian, other than a projective space. There are many further homogeneous spaces of the classical linear groups in common use in mathematics.

Prehomogeneous vector spaces
The idea of a prehomogeneous vector space was introduced by Mikio Sato.

It is a finite-dimensional vector space V with a group action of an algebraic group G, such that there is an orbit of G that is open for the Zariski topology (and so, dense). An example is GL(1) acting on a one-dimensional space.

The definition is more restrictive than it initially appears: such spaces have remarkable properties, and there is a classification of irreducible prehomogeneous vector spaces, up to a transformation known as "castling".

Homogeneous spaces in physics
Physical cosmology using the general theory of relativity makes use of the Bianchi classification system. Homogeneous spaces in relativity represent the space part of background metrics for some cosmological models; for example, the three cases of the Friedmann–Lemaître–Robertson–Walker metric may be represented by subsets of the Bianchi I (flat), V (open), VII (flat or open) and IX (closed) types, while the Mixmaster universe represents an anisotropic example of a Bianchi IX cosmology.

A homogeneous space of N dimensions admits a set of  Killing vectors. For three dimensions, this gives a total of six linearly independent Killing vector fields; homogeneous 3-spaces have the property that one may use linear combinations of these to find three everywhere non-vanishing Killing vector fields ,

where the object , the "structure constants", form a constant order-three tensor antisymmetric in its lower two indices (on the left-hand side, the brackets denote antisymmetrisation and ";" represents the covariant differential operator).

See also
 Erlangen program
 Klein geometry
 Heap (mathematics)
 Homogeneous variety

Notes

References
 John Milnor & James D. Stasheff (1974) Characteristic Classes, Princeton University Press 
 Takashi Koda An Introduction to the Geometry of Homogeneous Spaces from Kyungpook National University
 Menelaos Zikidis Homogeneous Spaces from Heidelberg University
 Shoshichi Kobayashi, Katsumi Nomizu (1969) Foundations of Differential Geometry, volume 2, chapter X, (Wiley Classics Library)

Topological groups
Lie groups